Mount Druitt is an electoral district of the Legislative Assembly in the Australian state of New South Wales. It is represented by Edmond Atalla of the Labor Party.

It is a 38.95 km² urban electorate in Sydney's outer west, taking in the suburbs of Mount Druitt, Bidwill, Blackett, Dean Park, Dharruk, Glendenning, Hassall Grove, Hebersham, Minchinbury, Oakhurst, Plumpton, Rooty Hill, Shalvey and parts of Colebee, Eastern Creek, Emerton and Lethbridge Park.

History
Mount Druitt was originally created in 1971 and abolished prior to the 1981 election and replaced by St Marys.  It was re-established prior to the 1991 election. It has always been represented by a member of the Labor party.

Members for Mount Druitt

Election results

References

Mount Druitt
1971 establishments in Australia
Constituencies established in 1971
1981 disestablishments in Australia
Constituencies disestablished in 1981
1991 establishments in Australia
Constituencies established in 1991